Ryers is a neighborhood in Northeast Philadelphia. Ryers is bounded by Cottman Avenue (PA 73) on the southwest, Fillmore Street on the northwest. Both of these highways separate Philadelphia from Cheltenham and Rockledge, Montgomery County.  The Fox Chase Line separates Ryers from Burholme and Fox Chase borders it via Hartel St. on the northeast.

The name Ryers comes from the Ryerss Estate which is located in Burholme Park along Central Avenue. The Estate was owned by Joseph Waln Ryerss who left it to his son Robert, a lawyer. Eight months before he died at the age of 65, Robert shocked Philadelphia society by marrying his housekeeper of many years, Mary Ann Reed. The will stipulated that upon Mary Ann’s death the estate was to be turned over to the city of Philadelphia to be used as a park, library, and museum “free to the public.” Before she died, Mary Ann Ryerss turned the property over to the city of Philadelphia in 1905. The Ryerss Museum and Library was opened to the public in 1910 under the administration of the Fairmount Park Commission. Who later left it to the Free Library of Philadelphia.

References

Neighborhoods in Philadelphia
Northeast Philadelphia